Hyoseong (Revised Romanization of ), also spelled Hyosŏng (McCune–Reischauer) or Hyosung (informal spelling) may refer to:
Hyosung, South Korean industrial conglomerate
Hyosŏng-dong, neighbourhood of Chongnam, South Pyongan, North Korea

People
Hyoseong of Silla (died 742), 34th monarch of the Korean kingdom of Silla
Bae Hyo-sung (born 1982), South Korean male footballer
Jun Hyo-seong (born 1989), South Korean female singer